Gitimoy Basu (born 5 March 1985) is an Indian cricketer. He played five first-class matches for Bengal between 2010 and 2014.

See also
 List of Bengal cricketers

References

External links
 

1985 births
Living people
Indian cricketers
Bengal cricketers
People from Howrah